A list of Turkish films released in 2018.

List of films

See also
2018 in Turkey

References

Film
2018
Lists of 2018 films by country or language